2nd II None is a rap group from Compton, California. It consists of cousins KK (born Kelton L. McDonald) and Gangsta D (born Deon Barnett). They were members of the Elm Street Piru Bloods.

History 

Their career started in 1987 after the release of "The Red Tape", they signed with Profile Records. They released their first album in 1991, the self-titled 2nd II None on Profile Records. Their second album, Classic 220 on Arista Records, released in 1999. 2nd II None and DJ Quik produced led album production. 

However, the most lasting and notable part of 2nd II None's legacy is having their seminal track and most popular single, "Up N' Da Club," be featured in The Sopranos episode "Full Leather Jacket." During the scene featuring the track, Furio Giunta, played by Federico Castelluccio, and associate Gaetano Giarizzo visit would-be gangsters Matt Bevilaqua and Sean Gismonte at their apartment to collect the hapless duo's kickup from a string of safe robberies committed with Christopher Moltisanti. 

In 2008, the band's 1994 unreleased album Tha Shit was leaked on the internet.

Discography

Studio albums

Unreleased albums
The Shit (1994)

Compilation albums
Tha Kollective (2009)

Singles

References 

Hip hop groups from California
Musical groups established in 1987
Musical groups from Los Angeles
Profile Records artists
Musicians from Compton, California
Gangsta rap groups
1987 establishments in California
Hip hop duos
Family musical groups
American musical duos
African-American musical groups
Bloods
Death Row Records artists